848 Inna (prov. designation:  or ) is a carbonaceous Themistian asteroid from the outer regions of the asteroid belt. It was discovered on 5 September 1915, by astronomer Grigory Neujmin at the Simeiz Observatory on the Crimean peninsula. It was named after Russian astronomer Inna Nikolaevna Leman-Balanovskaya (1881–1945).

Orbit and classification 

When applying the hierarchical clustering method to its proper orbital elements, Inna is a core member of the Themis family, a very large family of carbonaceous asteroids, named after 24 Themis. It orbits the Sun in the outer main-belt at a distance of 2.6–3.6 AU once every 5 years and 6 months (2,003 days; semi-major axis of 3.11 AU). Its orbit has an eccentricity of 0.16 and an inclination of 1° with respect to the ecliptic.

Discovery 

Inna was officially discovered on 5 September 1915, by Georgian–Russian astronomer Grigory Neujmin at the Simeiz Observatory on the Crimean peninsula. Four nights later, it was independently discovered by Max Wolf at Heidelberg Observatory on 9 September 1915, which is also the beginning of the body's observation arc. The Minor Planet Center, however, only credits the first astronomer with the discovery.

Naming 

This minor planet was named after Inna Nikolaevna Leman-Balanovskaya (1881–1945), a Russian astronomer at the Pulkovo Observatory near St Petersburg, Russia. The naming was not mentioned in The Names of the Minor Planets by Paul Herget in 1955. Lutz Schmadel, the author of the Dictionary of Minor Planet Names learned about the origin of the minor planet's name from private communications with astronomer Nikolai Chernykh (1931–2004), who worked as an astrometricist and Solar System dynamicist at the Crimean Astrophysical Observatory.

Physical characteristics 

In the Tholen-like taxonomy of the Small Solar System Objects Spectroscopic Survey (S3OS2), Inna is a common carbonaceous C-type asteroid, while in the survey's SMASS-like taxonomic variant, it is a Cb-subtype, transitioning to the somewhat brighter B-type asteroids. The Themis family has a "CB" overall spectral type. , no rotational lightcurve of Inna has been obtained from photometric observations. The body's rotation period, pole and shape remain unknown.

Diameter and albedo 

References

External links 
 Lightcurve Database Query (LCDB), at www.minorplanet.info
 Dictionary of Minor Planet Names, Google books
 Asteroids and comets rotation curves, CdR – Geneva Observatory, Raoul Behrend
 Discovery Circumstances: Numbered Minor Planets (1)-(5000) – Minor Planet Center
 
 

000848
Discoveries by Grigory Neujmin
Named minor planets
19150905